Eriogonum longifolium var. harperi, also known as Harper's buckwheat or Harper's umbrella plant, is a dicot of the family Polygonaceae, found in areas of nutrient-poor shale soils in Alabama, Kentucky and Tennessee. It lives inconspicuously in an immature vegetative stage for four or more years before developing a flowering stalk, then flowers and dies. It is listed as an endangered species by the state of Tennessee. It has eleven small populations in Alabama and five in Tennessee but its survival in Kentucky is uncertain. According to a leading expert, Professor James L. Reveal of the University of Maryland, its Kentucky population has been reportedly extirpated. Its 2006 Alabama Natural Heritage Program ranking was G4T2S1, demonstrating an opinion that it was "critically imperiled" in that state.

Plant communities
One of the larger E. longifolium var. harperi populations is found on TVA property in northern Alabama and is estimated to be over 700 plants. There the umbrella plants cohabit with prickly pear (Opuntia spp.) and false aloe (Manfreda virginica) in an upland calcareous cliff plant community. Their foothold is attributed to human removal of competitors to allow a better view of the Tennessee River from one of the buildings on the property.

Another northern Alabama population is found on a cedar glade site which is owned by the Alabama Nature Conservancy. This plant community is home to many other rare and endangered plants including Alabama glade cress (Leavenworthia alabamica), Alabama larkspur (Delphinium alabamicum), glade quillwort (Isoëtes butleri), lyrate bladderpod (Paysonia lyrata),  Nashville breadroot (Pediomelum subacaule), prairie Indian plantain (Arnoglossum plantagineum), Tennessee milk vetch (Astragalus tennesseensis), and yellow sunnybell (Schoenolirion croceum).

See also
 
 
 Buckwheat
 Cedar glade
 Ecology
 Endangered species
 Eriogonum - North American wild buckwheat
 Eriogonum longifolium - longleaf eriogonum or long-leaf wild buckwheat
 Eriogonum longifolium var. gnaphalifolium - scrub buckwheat
 Eriogonum longifolium var. lindheimeri
 Plant community
 Soils retrogression and degradation

References

External resources
Alabama inventory list 2003 (PDF)-see page 47
Alabama Prairie Grove Glades protected site
Tennessee endangered plant list from state.tn.us (PDF)-see page 15
University of Tennessee Herbarium link with photos
 USDA List of Tennessee state protected plants

longifolium var. harperi
Flora of the Southeastern United States
Flora of Alabama
Flora of Tennessee
Threatened flora of the United States